Juab School District is a school district located in eastern Juab County, Utah, United States. It serves the far eastern part of Juab County (Juab Valley, the portion of the county along the Interstate 15 corridor), while the Tintic School District serves the remaining portion of Juab County (west to the Nevada border). The district is the eleventh smallest of the 41 school districts within the state Juab School District is part of the Digital Promise League of Innovative Schools and winner of the Digital School Districts Survey 2017-2018.

Communities served
The Juab School District serves the following communities:

 Levan
 Mills
 Mona
 Nephi
 Rocky Ridge

Schools
The following are schools within the Juab School District:

Elementary schools

 Mona Elementary School - Mona
 Nebo View Elementary School - Nephi
 Red Cliffs Elementary School - Nephi

Junior high schools

 Juab Junior High School - Nephi

High schools

 Juab High School - Nephi

See also

 List of school districts in Utah
 Tintic School District

References

External links 

 
 

School districts in Utah
Education in Juab County, Utah